Joseph C. Ritchie was the mayor of Newport News, Virginia for ten years, from July 1, 1976 to June 30, 1986. Ritchie was the first Republican mayor for the city; in fact, his election to City Council in 1970 was the first time a Republican had been chosen to serve as a Councilman.

Ritchie's decade as mayor saw significant growth in the city. Major improvements to the infrastructure of the city were carried out during his terms. Ritchie himself considered the lowering of tax rates, a cause with which he was particularly involved in, to be key to growth in the city during this time. In 2017 Ritchie signed a "sister city" agreement with the city of Neyagawa, Osaka, Japan.

After serving as mayor, Ritchie returned to his career as a contractor, as owner and CEO of the Ritchie-Curbow Construction Company. The company is responsible for building several sites of interest in the Hampton Roads area. Ritchie is also a managing member of Newport News Town Center, LLC, responsible for the managing of the city's new City Center at Oyster Point district. In addition, Ritchie is an "organizer-director" of Virginia Company Bank, a new bank expecting to start serving residents and businesses in August 2005.

References

Mayors of Newport News, Virginia
Living people
Year of birth missing (living people)